Paris Bordone (Paris Paschalinus Bordone; 5 July 1500 – 19 January 1571) was an Italian painter of the Venetian Renaissance who, despite training with Titian, maintained a strand of Mannerist complexity and provincial vigor.

Biography

Bordone was born in Treviso, but had moved to Venice by late adolescence. He apprenticed briefly and unhappily (according to Vasari) with Titian. Vasari may have met the elder Bordone.

Bordone's works of the 1520s include the Holy Family in Florence, Sacra Conversazione with Donor (Glasgow), and Holy Family with St. Catherine (Hermitage Museum). The St. Ambrose and a Donor (1523) is now in the Pinacoteca di Brera. In 1525–26, Bordone painted an altarpiece for the church of S. Agostino in Crema, a Madonna with St. Christopher and St George (now in the Palazzo Tadini collection at Lovere). A second altarpiece, Pentecost, is also in the Pinacoteca di Brera.

In 1534–35, he painted his large-scale masterpiece for the Scuola di San Marco a canvas of The Fisherman Presenting the Ring to Doge Gradenigo (Accademia). However, comparison between this latter painting and the near-contemporary, and structurally similar, Presentation of the Virgin reveals Bordone's limitations, his use of superior perspective which creates dwarfed distant perspectives, and limited coloration relative to the brilliant tints of Titian.

Bordone also painted smaller cabinet pieces, showing half-figures, semi-undressed men and women from mythology or religious stories in a muscular interaction despite the crowded space. He frequently combined portraiture with allegory.

Paris Bordone subsequently executed many important mural paintings in Venice, Treviso and Vicenza, all of which have perished. In 1538 he was invited to France by Francis I, at whose court he painted many portraits, though no trace of them is to be found in French collections, the two portraits at the Louvre being later acquisitions. On his return journey he also worked for the Fugger palace at Augsburg, but again the works have been lost.

Partial list of works
 Annunciation in the Musée des Beaux-Arts de Caen
 Baptism of Christ in the National Gallery of Art, Washington, D.C.
 Bathsheba Bathing, with an African Servant - The Walters Art Museum, Baltimore
 Chess Players in Berlin
 Daphnis and Chloe - Porczyński Gallery, Warsaw
 Holy Family - Bridgewater House, Westminster
 Madonna - Accademia di Belle Arti Tadini at Lovere
 Mythological picture - the Galleria Borghese, Rome
 Mythological picture - the Doria Pamphilj Gallery, Rome
 The paintings in the Duomo of Treviso
 Rest on the Flight into Egypt - National Gallery of Victoria
 Portrait of a young woman - Thyssen-Bornemisza Museum, Madrid
 Perseus Armed by Mercury and Minerva - Birmingham Museum of Art
 A Portrait of a Lady  - The National Gallery, London
 Portrait of Giovanni Jacopo Caraglio - Wawel Castle, Kraków

References

Attribution
 

1500 births
1571 deaths
People from Treviso
15th-century Italian painters
Italian male painters
16th-century Italian painters
Renaissance painters
Painters from Venice